"Don't Bring Me Down" is the ninth and final track on the English rock band the Electric Light Orchestra's 1979 album Discovery. It is their highest-charting hit in the United States to date.

History

"Don't Bring Me Down" is the band's second-highest-charting hit in the UK, where it peaked at number 3, and their biggest hit in the United States, peaking at number 4 on the Billboard Hot 100. It also charted well in Canada (number 1) and Australia (number 6). This was the first single by ELO not to include a string section.

The drum track is in fact a tape loop, coming from "On the Run" looped and slowed down.

The song ends with the sound of a door slamming. According to producer Jeff Lynne, this was a metal fire door at Musicland Studios where the song was recorded.

The song was dedicated to the NASA Skylab space station, which re-entered the Earth's atmosphere and burned up over the Indian Ocean and Western Australia on 11 July 1979.

On 4 November 2007, Lynne was awarded a BMI (Broadcast Music, Inc) Million-Air certificate for "Don't Bring Me Down" for the song having reached two million airplays.

Misheard lyric

A common mondegreen in the song is the perception that, following the title line, Lynne shouts "Bruce!" In the liner notes of the ELO compilation Flashback and elsewhere, Lynne has explained that he is singing a made-up word, "Groos", which some have suggested sounds like the German expression "Gruß," meaning "greeting." Lynne has explained that originally he did not realize the meaning of the syllable, and he just used it as a temporary placekeeper to fill a gap in the lyrics, but upon learning the German meaning he decided to leave it in.  After the song's release, so many people had misinterpreted the word as "Bruce" that Lynne actually began to sing the word as "Bruce" for fun at live shows.

ELO engineer Reinhold Mack remembers the genesis of the term differently, stating that Lynne was actually singing "Bruce" as a joke in advance of an Australian tour "referring to how many Australian guys are called Bruce."

Critical reception
AllMusic's Donald Guarisco praised ELO for not including a string section in the song: "Electric Light Orchestra can easily be summed up as 'pop music with strings.' Thus, it is pretty ironic that the group's biggest American hit, "Don't Bring Me Down", features no string section at all", adding that "it proved that Electric Light Orchestra could be just as interesting without the string section and thus paved the way for later string-less  hits like "Hold On Tight" and "Calling America", concluding that it was a song that was "powerful enough for rock fans but dance-friendly enough for the disco set". Billboard found the song to be Beatlesque while praising the multiple "irresistible" instrumental and vocal hooks. Cash Box similarly described it as being influenced by the Beatles, particularly the song "You Can't Do That," and said that the song "brims with overdubbed Lynne harmonies and a pounding rhythm track."  Record World said that "From the opening drum blasts, through the harmony vocal/percussion break, to the echo-filled closing, this song rocks." Ultimate Classic Rock rated "Don't Bring Me Down" as the 97th greatest classic rock song, saying it "may just be Jeff Lynne's most concise and representative musical statement."

Music video
A music video was produced, which showed the band performing the song interspersed with various animations relating to the song's subject matter, including big-bottomed majorettes and a pulsating neon frankfurter. The band's three resident string players are depicted playing keyboards in the music video.

Jeff Lynne version
Jeff Lynne re-recorded the song in his own home studio. It was released on a compilation album with other re-recorded ELO songs called Mr. Blue Sky: The Very Best of Electric Light Orchestra.

Personnel
Jeff Lynne – vocals, guitar, piano, synthesizer
Bev Bevan – drums, percussion
Richard Tandy – grand piano, synthesizer, electric piano, clavinet
Kelly Groucutt – bass, vocals

Cover versions and remixes
In 2012, The Hives released a song called "Go Right Ahead". Though not a direct cover, the main riff in the song is nearly identical to the one in "Don't Bring Me Down", and as a result Jeff Lynne was credited as a co-writer.
Country stars Little Big Town, Kacey Musgraves and Midland performed the song on The Tonight Show Starring Jimmy Fallon to promote their The Breakers Tour.
American rock band Black Stone Cherry covered the song on their 2020 album The Human Condition.

Chart and sales

Weekly charts

Year-end charts

Sales and certifications

See also
List of number-one singles of 1979 (Canada)

References

External links
In-depth Song Analysis at the Jeff Lynne Song Database (jefflynnesongs.com)

1979 songs
1979 singles
Electric Light Orchestra songs
British pop rock songs
Jet Records singles
RPM Top Singles number-one singles
Song recordings produced by Jeff Lynne
Songs written by Jeff Lynne